Archbishop Ryan may refer to:

 Dermot Ryan (1924–1985), archbishop of Dublin, Ireland
 James Hugh Ryan (1886–1947), archbishop of Omaha, Nebraska
 Joseph T. Ryan (1913–2000), archbishop of Anchorage, Alaska and archbishop for the military services, USA
 Patrick Finbar Ryan (1881–1975), archbishop of Port of Spain, Trinidad
 Patrick John Ryan (1831–1911), archbishop of Philadelphia, Pennsylvania